Hermaea may be:
 Hermaea (festival), a festival in honor of Hermes
 Hermaea (gastropod), a gastropod genus in the family Hermaeidae